Belgium was represented by the song "Hey Nana", performed by Micha Marah at the 1979 Eurovision Song Contest, which took place in Jerusalem on 31 March.

Before Eurovision

Eurosong 
Although the Belgian preselection consisted of only six songs (all performed by Marah), broadcaster BRT managed to spin out the selection process for five weeks by means of a one-off format which, rather unsurprisingly, was never used again. All the shows were held at the Amerikaans Theater in Brussels and hosted by Karl Buts.

Semi-finals
Four semi-finals were held in February 1979 to select the three songs to progress to the final. In the first three semi-finals the lowest-placed song, after a public vote, was eliminated, leaving three songs in the fourth semi-final, where they were joined by Marah's own second-chance choice from the three previously eliminated songs. In the fourth semi-final, again the bottom song was eliminated and the three survivors went on to the final. Many found the whole process - whereby it had taken four weeks to narrow six songs down to three - somewhat absurd and pointless, particularly as the three songs which ended up qualifying for the final had been the top three songs in every round of voting.

"Alles zal zich weer herhalen" was selected as Marah's second-chance choice.

Final
The final was held on 3 March 1979 with the three surviving songs, this time voted on by a 20-strong "expert" jury rather than the public. In the only real surprise in the entire event, the jury went for "Hey Nana" as their choice, although it had finished well behind "Comment ça va?" in every round of public voting. It was not a popular decision, as it was pointed out that the public had clearly and consistently indicated their preference for "Comment ça va?", only to have their choice overturned by 20 people.

At Eurovision 
On the night of the final Marah performed 12th in the running order, following France and preceding Luxembourg. At the close of the voting "Hey Nana" had received just 5 points, placing Belgium joint last (with Austria) of the 19 entries, the fifth time Belgium had found itself at the bottom of the Eurovision scoreboard. The Belgian jury awarded its 12 points to Spain.

"Hey Nana" is noted for lyrics which those who understood Dutch cited as among the most facile and childish ever heard at Eurovision. Marah herself made no secret of her dislike for the song, refusing even to record it, making it one of very few Eurovision songs never to have been released commercially in its home territory.

Voting

References 

1979
Countries in the Eurovision Song Contest 1979
Eurovision